The Southwest Florida Water Management District (or SWFWMD, pronounced as "swiftmud" based on the word acronym), is one of five regional agencies directed by Florida state law to protect and preserve water resources. Established in 1961 the agency operates and maintains several large properties and flood protection projects, sometimes with other agencies. The District's responsibilities have expanded to include managing water supply and protecting water quality and the natural systems — rivers, lakes, wetlands and associated uplands.The District's stated mission is to protect water resources, minimize flood risks and ensure the public’s water needs are met.

Area of jurisdiction

Administration and funding
A 13-member Governing Board oversees District activities. Members are unpaid volunteers appointed by the Governor and confirmed by the state Senate to four-year terms to set policy and administer the budget. The Board chooses an executive director who is approved by the state Senate. The executive director oversees a diverse staff of professionals, including engineers, geologists, biologists, attorneys, educators and administrators.

Funding comes from voter-approved ad valorem property taxes, along with state and federal funding such as the state's Florida Forever Program. While there is a legislative limit on the tax levy of 1 mill ($1 for each $1,000 of assessed land value), actual tax levies have been less than the maximum.

Public areas
Every year, about 2.5 million people visit public conservation lands acquired by the District and its partners to protect Florida's water resources. Properties in the district include:

Alafia River Reserve in Polk County
Annutteliga Hammock in Hernando County
 Brooker Creek Headwaters Nature Preserve in Hillsborough County
 Brooker Creek Preserve in Pinellas County
 Charlotte Harbor Preserve State Park in Charlotte County
 Chassahowitzka River and Coastal Swamps in Citrus County
 Chito Branch Reserve in Hillsborough County
 Circle B Bar Reserve in Polk County
 Cliff Stephens Park in Pinellas County
 Conner Preserve in Pasco County
 Cypress Creek Preserve in Pasco County
 Deep Creek Preserve in DeSoto County
 Edward Medard Park and Reservoir in Hillsborough County
 Edward W. Chance Reserve Coker Prairie and Gilley Creek tracts in Manatee County
 Flying Eagle Preserve in Citrus County
 McGregor Smith Boy Scout Reservation in Citrus County
 Withlapopka Community Park in Citrus County
 Green Swamp Wilderness Preserve in Pasco, Sumter, Lake and Polk counties
 Colt Creek State Park in Polk County
 East Tract in Sumter, Lake and Polk counties
 Hampton Tract in Polk County
 Little Withlacoochee Tract in Lake County
 West Tract in Pasco County
 Half Moon-Gum Slough in Sumter County
 Halpata Tastanaki Preserve in Marion County
 Jack Creek in Highlands County
 Lake Marion Creek Horseshoe Scrub Tract in Polk County
 Lake Panasoffkee in Sumter County
 Lake Tarpon Outfall Canal in Pinellas County
 Little Manatee River Lower Tract in Hillsborough County
 Little Manatee River Southfork Tract in Manatee County
 Little Manatee River Upper Tract in Hillsborough County
 Lower Hillsborough Wilderness Preserve in Hillsborough County
 Deer Prairie Creek Preserve, Flatford Swamp Preserve, and Myakka Prairie Tract on the Myakka River in Sarasota, Manatee, and Sarasota counties
 Myakka State Forest in Sarasota County
 Panasoffkee Outlet in Sumter County
 Potts Preserve in Citrus County
 Prairie/ Shell Creek in Charlotte County
 RV Griffin Reserve in DeSoto County
 Sawgrass Lake Park in Pinellas County
 Schultz Preserve in Hillsborough County
 Starkey Wilderness Preserve, Serenova Tract and Anclote River Ranch Tract in Pasco County
 Tampa Bypass Canal in Hillsborough County
 Terra Ceia Preserve Frog Creek in Manatee County
 Terra Ceia Preserve State Park in Manatee County
 Two Mile Prairie in Citrus County
 Upper Hillsborough Preserve in Pasco and Polk counties
 Weekiwachee Preserve in Hernando County
 Withlacoochee River Park in Pasco County
 Wysong Park in Sumter County

See also
Northwest Florida Water Management District
St. Johns River Water Management District
South Florida Water Management District
Suwannee River Water Management District
Water wars in Florida

References

External links
 Official website
 Water Management Districts at Florida Department of Environmental Protection

Water management authorities in the United States
State agencies of Florida
 
Water in Florida
1961 establishments in Florida
Government agencies established in 1961
Organizations based in Hernando County, Florida
Brooksville, Florida